The Second Battle of Jaunde involved the successful British and French assault on the German capital of Jaunde during the Kamerun campaign of the First World War. After the failure of the First Battle of Jaunde during the summer of 1915, the bulk of Allied forces had retreated to the Kele river. Following the Second Duala Conference where Allied commanders discussed the situation, it was decided that another assault should be attempted. Although the columns surrounding Jaunde were not in effective communication with one another, on 1 January 1916, British forces under Colonel Georges occupied the capital. By this time it had been abandoned by the German troops who had fled to the neutral Spanish colony of Río Muni. This Allied victory signaled the end of German resistance in Kamerun apart from the Siege of Mora which would continue for another few months.

Notes

References
 Burg, David F., and L. Edward. Purcell. Almanac of World War I. Lexington, KY: University of Kentucky, 1998.
 Dane, Edmund. British Campaigns in Africa and the Pacific, 1914-1918,. London: Hodder and Stoughton, 1919.
  O'Neill, Herbert C. The War in Africa and the Far East. London: London Longmans Green, 1918.
 Strachan, Hew. The First World War. Vol. I: To Arms. Oxford: Oxford University Press, 2001.

Battles of World War I involving Germany
Battles of World War I involving France
Battles of World War I involving the United Kingdom
African theatre of World War I
Battles of the African Theatre (World War I)
Military history of Cameroon
Kamerun
Battles of the Kamerun campaign
Conflicts in 1915
Conflicts in 1916
1915 in Africa
1916 in Africa
1910s in Kamerun
October 1915 events
November 1915 events
December 1915 events
January 1916 events